Balzer may refer to:

Surname
 Arthur J. Balzer (1895–1962), American merchant
 Falk Balzer (b. 1973), German athlete
 Félix Balzer (1849–1929), French physician
 George Balzer (1915–2006), American screenwriter
 Howard Balzer, American sports writer, editor and broadcaster 
 Johann Balzer (1738–1799), Czech engraver
 Karin Balzer (1938–2019), East German athlete
 Oswald Balzer (1858–1933), Polish historian
 Robert Lawrence Balzer (1912–2011), American wine journalist
 Stephen M. Balzer (c. 1864–1940) Hungarian-American mechanic and inventor

Other
 Balzer Jacobsen , Prime Minister of the Faroe Islands
 Balzer, original name of the town of Krasnoarmeysk, Saratov Oblast, Russia
 Balzer (automobile), American automobile manufacturer

See also
 Balzers, a village in Liechtenstein 

Surnames from given names